The Oatman Filling Station is located in Eau Claire, Wisconsin. It was added to the National Register of Historic Places in 2001.

History
The filling station was built by Frank Oatman in 1931. The station is the sole intact gas station in Eau Claire from before 1940.  Many gas stations built between 1920 and 1935 were designed to look like houses, because oil companies were starting to build gas stations in neighborhoods and residents were objecting to utilitarian structures that looked like lumber or coal yard buildings.  The Oatman Filling Station building incorporated Tudor Revival cottage styling and included office and restroom space.  It was affiliated with Texaco for most of its existence, but from the late 1980s until it closed in September 1996, it was a Sinclair Oil affiliate.

References

Buildings and structures in Eau Claire, Wisconsin
Tudor Revival architecture in Wisconsin
Transport infrastructure completed in 1931
Retail buildings in Wisconsin
Gas stations on the National Register of Historic Places in Wisconsin
National Register of Historic Places in Eau Claire County, Wisconsin